Remote is a 1993 American comedy film that was released directly to video on September 22, 1993 by Paramount Pictures through Moonbeam Entertainment. It stars Chris Carrara, Jessica Bowman, and John Diehl. Ted Nicolaou directed the films and it was written by Mike Farrow, best known for his hard-boiled detective persona Tommy Sledge. It is the second film to be released by Moonbeam Entertainment, following Prehysteria! (1993).

Plot

Randy Mason (Chris Carrara) is a teenage tech whiz who lives in a suburban neighborhood located somewhere in the state of California with his mother Marti (Derya Ruggles), who creates designs for an ad agency and his father Brent (who's away for the duration of the film on a business trip). Randy designs and uses remote controlled models as a hobby, as well as using the modified controllers for other purposes as well. Among them is a helicopter named Huey, a double-winged plane, a WWII fighter plane called Zero, red and blue racecars, a green monster truck, a Godzilla knockoff and a yodeling mountain climber named Gunther. He shares the hobby with his good friend and love interest Judy Riley (Jessica Bowman), an avid baseball player and shows her the local model home which serves as his secret hideout.

After Randy pulls a prank on a bully across the street named Ben (Jordan Belfi) by using one of his remotes to mess with his TV control and then uses the helicopter to drop an empty Coke can on Ben's head (which Ben threw in his yard in the first place), Ben steals Randy's fighter plane. Randy reluctantly lets him take it, but tells him the controller is locked by at night with the others, so Ben insists he bring it to school the next day to give to him. Randy does, but brings his own controller to try to take it back from Ben when he's using it, but the dueling controllers result in the plane accidentally flying into the classroom where Randy's science class is and after causing chaos among the students, crashes into the project of his friend Jamaal (Kenneth A. Brown).

Getting the blame for it because no one saw Ben, Randy is expelled from the school and arrives home to hear Marti saying on the answering machine (she was stressed and too upset to think at the moment) that she heard about what happened and is going to confiscate all of his models. Randy then decides to hide them at the model home until Marti calms down. Judy suggests the best thing to do is tell the truth about Ben, but Randy also feels responsible for what happened and doesn't further wish to incur Ben's anger. Judy helps him under protest and she reminds Randy of her baseball game that night. Despite having forgotten about it, he says he'll be there.

As Randy is leaving later, he stumbles across three store robbers named Delbert McCoy (John Diehl), Louis (Tony Longo), and Louis' cousin Richie Marinelli (Stuart Fratkin). The three robbers (having robbed a convenience store, but left the money behind by accident) decide to break into and hide at the model home until the road blocks the cops set up for them are cleared away in 3–4 days. The ill-tempered Delbert (embarrassed by his real name and insistent on being called Del) has a gun which is why they have been labeled on the news as armed and dangerous. They unwittingly trap Randy in the attic when he hides from them not knowing he's there by taking the ladder to the window away after he's climbed up. The robbers use the ladder and packs of cigarettes in order to create a path on the carpet that keeps them from walking on the alarm sensor pads.

Randy attempts to use his helicopter to contact the eccentric real estate agent Mrs. Williams (Lorna Scott) who's driving by in her car with a written message, but she doesn't see it and eventually, the helicopter can't keep up with the car. Randy also tries to trip the burglars up by using Gunther to put a tack in Richie's shoe, but he and Louis just barely avoid stepping on the alarm pads. Randy attempts to steal the gun, but it proves too heavy for Gunther to lift. Getting hungry, Randy uses Gunther to steal Louis' sirloin steak and then when attempting to steal the can of baked beans, Randy runs into the same problem he did with the gun earlier and is forced to drop the can on Richie's head, which he believes Louis did.

At her game, Judy gets worried about Randy not being there and calls his house and leaves a message. Marti hears the message when she comes home from work and not having any idea where Randy is, calls the police. When Marti tells Ben and his mother Dee about Randy disappearing, Ben accidentally reveals a bit more than he should have known, to which Dee (hinted at being emotionally and possibly physically abusive) declares to Marti that she'll figure out if her son knows more than he's letting on and drags him away. After using his bag straps to try climbing out the window and failing, Randy falls asleep at about the same time as the crooks. Marti stays by the phone that night and falls asleep on the couch. Judy and her family get home late from the game and go straight to sleep, not noticing that Marti called earlier and left a message on the machine.

The next morning when Judy gets up, she notices the message and listens to it. After calling Marti and hearing how worried she is, Judy then sets out on her own to find Randy. Louis looks out the window and sees her coming towards the model home and alerts Delbert and Richie. Randy sees her coming too and when the crooks take Judy hostage, Randy proceeds to use the remote controlled toys against them to prevent them from escaping and to rescue Judy. After Louis breaks into the attic using a knife to pick the lock, Randy uses the Godzilla model to melt roofing tar in a bucket and dump it on Louis' head, causing Louis to fall onto the carpet that sets off the alarm. Randy then uses the helicopter to sic Mrs. Williams' bulldog Bluto on Richie and then uses the airplane to tie Richie up with a flag line.

Randy disarms Delbert using Gunther and Judy picks up his gun and throws it away. Delbert angrily makes his way towards Judy, but Randy gets Delbert to step on each of the racecars and uses them as remote controlled roller skates to lead him away. Delbert ends up crashing into rocks and is thrown through the air into a cardboard sign for the real estate company. The police arrive and arrest Louis and Richie (and presumably Delbert as well), Randy is reunited with Marti and Jamaal and Mrs. Williams with Bluto (who ran away from her). Randy and Judy quietly agree to find a new secret hideout and the film ends as Randy lures the yodeling Gunther down from the top of the roof.

DVD release
The film is currently available for online viewing on Full Moon Features and Tubi. It was released on Blu-ray by Full Moon Features on February 8, 2022.
"The movie is a 3/10" - Ric

References

External links

1993 comedy films
1993 films
American comedy films
Films directed by Ted Nicolaou
Films scored by Richard Band
1990s English-language films
1990s American films